Knut Axel Lennart Agnred (born 29 February 1956 in Johannebergs församling in Gothenburg) is a Swedish singer, actor,  and comedian. He is known for being a member of Galenskaparna och After Shave.

Life and career
Knut Agnred is the son of the athlete Lennart Andersson, who adopted the surname Agnred. He was educated in electrical engineering after studying at Chalmers University of Technology in Gothenburg. He has also worked in elderly care at Kålltorps sjukhem in Gothenburg. He has been a member of the comedy group After Shave since its inception in 1979. Agnred has written lyrics and music for several songs performed by Galenskaparna och After Shave.

Agnred has collaborated with Ken Wennerholm and Göran Rudbo in Triple & Touch and released a solo album called Text & music in 2004. In March 2009, the death metal band Despite released their debut album In Your Despite, which Knut Agnred contributed to on the opening track "Mindplague".

Filmography

Film

Television

Theatre 

 1982 – Skruven är lös
 1983 – Träsmak
 1985 – Cyklar
 1987 – Stinsen brinner
 1991 – Grisen i säcken
 1992 – Skruven är lös
 1993 – Nått nytt?
 1994 – Resan som blev av
 1994 – Lyckad nedfrysning av herr Moro
 1997 – Alla ska bada
 2000 – Allt Möjligt
 2000 – Jul Jul Jul
 2001 – Den onde, den gode, den fule och Rippe
 2002 – Kasinofeber
 2004 – Falkes fondue
 2007–2009 – Cabaret Cartwright
 2009–2011 – En kväll med "After Shave och Anders Eriksson" (även "Best of After Shave och Anders Eriksson")
 2010 – Gubbröra och Pyttipanna, med After Shave och Anders Eriksson
 2010–2011 – Hagmans Konditori
 2012–2014 – 30-årsfesten
 2015–2016 – Spargrisarna kan rädda världen

Discography
Solo
2004 – Text & musik (CD)
2004 – "Världen är full av dårar" (CD single)

References

External links

Kulturtuben – Knut Agnred
Knut Agnred on Discogs

1956 births
Living people
Singers from Gothenburg
Swedish male film actors
Swedish male stage actors
Swedish male musical theatre actors
Swedish male comedians
Swedish male singers
Galenskaparna och After Shave members
20th-century Swedish comedians
21st-century Swedish comedians